Karki (Devanagari/कार्की) is a Nepali/Kumaoni surname used by Khas people. It is found among the Chhetri community from Nepal. Karki was one of the titles of governmental posts in ancient Khasa kingdom. The tax collecting officers in Dara/Garkha had the governmental title of karki. There are various subgroups within the Karki family.  'Rikhle Karki', 'Lama Karki', 'Sutar Karki', 'Mudula Karki', 'Khulal Karki', 'Khaptari Karki', Rume Karki, 'Sinjapati Karki', 'Godar Karki', etc. are the clans of Karki.  ].

Notable people with surname Karki
Notable people who bear the name Karki include:
 

 Bipin Karki, Nepalese actor
 Dipak Karki, Nepalese politician
 Gyanendra Bahadur Karki, Nepalese politician
 Lokman Singh Karki, Nepalese civil servant, former head of CIAA
 Neelam Karki "Niharika", Nepalese poet
 Priyanka Karki, Nepalese actress
 Ram Karki, Nepalese politician
 Sushila Karki, Nepalese jurist and first female Chief Justice of Nepal (2016 – 2017)
 Sushma Karki, Nepalese actress
 Swarup Singh Karki, Kaji and later, Dewan of the Kingdom of Nepal (c.1775 – c.1777)

See also

Karli (name)
Karri (name)
Khadka
Katwal

References

Surnames of Nepalese origin
Khas surnames